WKZX may refer to:
 WKZX (Maine), a radio station broadcasting on 950 AM in Presque Isle, Maine
 WKZX-FM 93.5 FM is a radio station broadcasting a Regional Mexican format licensed to Lenoir City, Tennessee
 WNPX-TV or WKZX, an Ion Television-owned-and-operated station serving Nashville, Tennessee